Baduk may refer to:
 
 Baduk (game), Korean name for the board game Go
 Baduk (film), 1992 Iranian film by director Majid Majidi